Bidein a' Choire Sheasgaich is a remote mountain in the Northwest Highlands of Scotland.

Geographical situation and topography

Bidein a' Choire Sheasgaich, is situated west of Loch Monar and east of the strath of Bearneas and the Attadale Forest, and is at the apex of a horseshoe of Munros around the loch.  Glen Carron lies to the north and Glen Shiel to the south.

The mountain, also known by the nickname "Cheese Grater", is located on the Attadale Estate. The bedrock is of the Glenfinnan Group of the Moine Supergroup – highly metamorphosed sedimentary sandstone.

The summit it guarded by crags to the north and east but there is a straightforward approach via Sail Riabach a kilometre or so to the southwest. The ridge between Bidein and Lurg Mhor and the path from the south have no technical difficulties.

Approaches to the mountain
Bidein a' Choire Sheasgaich and Lurg Mhòr are, according to Cameron McNeish, "two of the lonliest Munros in the land" An approach can be made from the north, the east or the west. All the approach routes are long and arduous but, if a two-day expedition is planned, three open bothies are available as an alternative to wild camping.

The route from the east is along, and possibly around, Loch Monar which is reached through Glen Strathfarrar. From Struy a private road goes along the glen to the foot of the loch at Monar Lodge. Cycling is allowed and a very limited number of vehicles are also permitted access. Even if using a mountain bike the expedition is, according to Dan Bailey "a single epic trip, which can be undertaken either as an appealingly brutal one-day assault or a slower overnighter". The route round the loch traversing these Munros and the three immediately north of the loch is  plus  cycling – 18 hours.

The shortest route to the mountain from a public road is from Achnashellach (Lair) in Glen Carron to the north on the A890 but to start off it is necessary to wade across the River Carron or use the two-wire bridge – cycling is not an option. Otherwise, from Craig nearby there is a somewhat longer route which may be cycled for the first  – this way the total distance to Bidean is  – 5 hours on foot.

Bearnais bothy is a Mountain Bothies Association bothy not far off these routes and for a stop-over it is conveniently located.

From the west at Attadale there is an  track along which a mountain bike may be ridden, with difficulty, to the open bothy at Ben Dronaig Lodge which is maintained by the Attadale Estate to a very high standard. From bothy to Bidein is another  on a stalkers' path. A shorter  stalkers' path leads to this bothy from Achintee (Strathcarron station).

Notes

References

Citations

Works cited

Mountains and hills of the Northwest Highlands
Mountains and hills of Highland (council area)
Munros
Marilyns of Scotland